Netanya (also known as Natanya) is a city in the Northern Central District of Israel, and is the capital of the surrounding Sharon plain. Netanya was named in honor of Nathan Straus, a prominent Jewish American merchant and philanthropist in the early 20th century who was the co-owner of Macy's department store.

Its  of beaches have made the city a popular tourist resort. 
An additional 150,000 people live in the local and regional councils within  of Netanya, which serves as a regional center for them. The city mayor is Miriam Feirberg.

History

Before the 20th century, parts of Netanya belonged to the Forest of Sharon, a hallmark of the region’s historical landscape. It was an open woodland dominated by Mount Tabor Oak (Quercus ithaburensis), which extended from Kfar Yona in the north to Ra’ananna in the south. The local Arab inhabitants traditionally used the area for pasture, firewood and intermittent cultivation. The intensification of settlement and agriculture in the coastal plain during the 19th century led to deforestation and subsequent environmental degradation known from Hebrew sources.

Netanya was established near the ancient site of Poleg by the Bnei Binyamin association in Zikhron Ya'akov. It was named in honor of Nathan (Hebrew: Natan) Straus (1848–1931), co-owner of Macy's department store, New York City Parks Commissioner, and president of the New York City Board of Health, who gifted two-thirds of his personal fortune to projects benefiting Jews and Arabs in Mandatory Palestine. "Netanya...was named for Straus in the hope he would donate money to them. When he told them he had no more money to give they were disappointed, but decided to keep the city's name anyway." The funds for the project of building Netanya were raised by Itamar Ben-Avi and Oved Ben-Ami, who embarked on a fundraising trip to the United States to raise the money. In 1928 members of Bnei Binyamin and Hanotea, an organisation set up after Straus was informed of the establishment of the settlement, purchased  of Umm Khaled lands.

On December 14, 1928, a team led by Moshe Shaked began digging for water at the site. After water was discovered in February 1929, the first five settlers moved onto the land. In the weeks that followed, more settlers began arriving. Development was set back due to the 1929 Palestine riots and massacre of Jews. By September, however, development was back on track with the cornerstones for the first 10 houses being laid on Sukkot.

The first kindergarten opened in 1930 and the first school in 1931. In the 1931 census of Palestine, Netanya was recorded as having 253 residents. In 1933, the British architect Clifford Holliday drew up a plan for Netanya as a tourist resort. Holliday also designed urban projects in Jaffa, Tiberias, Lydda and Ramla. The first urban plan divided the city into three sections with a tourism district along the coastline, housing, farms and commerce in the center, and agriculture and industry to the east. That year also saw the completion of the Tel Aviv Hotel, the first hotel in Netanya, as well as the establishment of two new neighborhoods, Ben Zion and Geva.

The moshava  continued to grow in 1934, when the first ship of illegal immigrants carried 350 to Netanya's shoreline. These operations continued until 1939, with over seventeen ships landing near the city, being aided by the residents of Netanya. Whilst flourishing agriculturally, 1934 also saw the city diversify with Primazon opening the first factory there, producing fruit and vegetable preserves. Following this, the first industrial zone was set up, whilst the Shone Halahot Synagogue was built and the Bialik School inaugurated.

In 1937 the cornerstone was laid for a new commercial center and the connection of Netanya to the Tel Aviv-Haifa road. In 1939, the Ophir diamond polishing plant, the first diamond polishing plant in Palestine, was opened by Asher Daskall and Zvi Rosenberg. In 1940, the British Mandate government defined Netanya as a local council of which Oved Ben-Ami was elected head. In 1944, Netanya had a population of 4,900. The first high school in Netanya opened in 1945.

During the Jewish insurgency in Palestine, the Jewish underground group Irgun launched a number of attacks against British military and police forces in the Netanya area. The town itself was a bastion of support for the Irgun. The most infamous incident happened in July 1947, in what became known as the Sergeants affair. After three Irgun fighters had been sentenced to death by the British, the Irgun abducted two British sergeants on a Netanya street, and hid them in an abandoned factory. The British responded by declaring martial law and placing Netanya and the surrounding area under curfew. The British Army searched the town and interrogated residents, but did not find the sergeants. After the three Irgun fighters were hanged, the Irgun hanged the two sergeants in the factory and re-hanged and booby trapped their bodies in an orange grove.

In November 1947, an Egged bus which left Netanya for Jerusalem was attacked in Petah Tikva. In 1948, following the withdrawal of British forces from Netanya and the 1948 Arab-Israeli War, a large military base was established in the city. On December 3, 1948, after fighting in the area had calmed down, Netanya was designated a city, the first city to be designated in the newly established State of Israel. A number of nearby settlements, Ramat Tiomkin, Ein Hatchlelet, Pardes Hagdud, and Ramat Ephraim, were annexed to Netanya. At this time, Netanya had a population of 11,600. In 1949, the Kiryat Eliezer Kaplan Industrial Zone was inaugurated and the nearby settlement of Neve Itamar, which had been founded in 1944, was annexed to Netanya.

Netanya railway station was opened in 1953. With Israel experiencing a wave of Jewish immigration from Europe, elsewhere in the Middle East, and North Africa, Netanya's population expanded. In the years following independence, approximately 14,000 Libyan Jewish immigrants settled in Netanya. The population reached 31,000 in 1955. To accommodate the influx of newcomers, the Israeli Housing Ministry built housing units of 50 square meters. The cornerstone of Kiryat Sanz, a religious neighborhood was laid in 1956. The first stock exchange built in Israel was built in Netanya. By 1961, the city's population had grown to 41,300.

During the Six-Day War in 1967, Netanya was hit by Jordanian artillery, and Jordanian planes made sorties near Netanya, but failed to cause major damage. A lone Iraqi bomber attacked Netanya, dropping several bombs which damaged a factory and caused some casualties, shortly before being shot down.

Netanya had a population of 71,100 in 1972. Laniado Hospital opened its doors in 1975, starting with an outpatient clinic, and gradually expanding throughout the following years. The population had grown to 102,300 in 1983. Two master plans for the city, released in 1982 and 1985 respectively, saw the new standard apartment size increase to a minimum of 100 square meters. Hotel development along the coast was further advanced, and tourism gradually increased. At its peak in the 1980s, Netanya accounted for 10% of national tourism. This, together with its thriving diamond industry, led it to be known as the "tourism and diamond city." Tourism would later slow down after the diamond industry moved away and government budgets would focus on developing other areas for tourism.

In the 1990s, large numbers of immigrants from the former Soviet Union settled in Netanya, greatly expanding the city's population and resulting in large-scale housing construction.

Netanya suffered from several Palestinian bombings during the Second Intifada, including the Netanya Market bombing and, in the same month, the Passover massacre which caused the death of 29 people. Such attacks were cited as justification for the construction of the Israeli West Bank barrier which has proved effective in stemming suicide attacks.

Following increased immigration by French Jews to Israel in the 2000s and 2010s, Netanya became one of their primary destinations. Thousands of French immigrants settled in Netanya, which influenced the local culture.

Demographics

The population density of the city is 7,115 per square kilometer. The population is expected to be around 320,000 in 2035. According to a 2001 survey by the CBS, 99.9% of the population are Jewish and other non-Arabs. In 2001 alone, the city became home to 1,546 immigrants. According to CBS, in 2001 there were 78,800 males and 84,900 females with the population of the city being spread out, with 31.1% 19 years of age or younger, 15.3% between 20 and 29, 17.2% between 30 and 44, 17.4% from 45 to 59, 4.2% from 60 to 64, and 14.9% 65 years of age or older.

In terms of the origin of Netanya's residents, 63,800 originate from Europe and America, 30,200 from North Africa, 18,100 from Asia, 10,500 from Ethiopia and 38,100 from Israel in 2008. That same year, 90,200 of the residents of Netanya were born in Israel, whilst 71,300 were born abroad. A significant number of Ethiopian Jews in Israel have settled in Netanya with over 10,500 Ethiopian Jewish residents in the city. Netanya is also the center of the Persian Jewish community of Israel.

As of 2000, the city had 58,897 salaried workers and 4,671 self-employed with the mean monthly wage in 2000 for a salaried worker in the city being NIS 4,905, a real change of 8.6% over the course of 2000. Salaried males have a mean monthly wage of NIS 6,217 (a real change of 9.0%) versus NIS 3,603 for females (a real change of 6.8%). The mean income for the self-employed is 6,379. There are 3,293 people who receive unemployment benefits and 14,963 people who receive an income guarantee.

In terms of religion, Netanya is made up approximately of 50% secular Jews. It is also the home of the Sanzer dynasty and has a large Chabad Lubavitch presence.

Economy

Industry in Netanya is largely divided between four industrial parks. In the south of the city, the newest of these, Poleg, houses the first branch of IKEA in Israel as well as many technology companies, such as Ceedo and LogiTag. Tourism also plays a fairly major part in Netanya's economy with some 19 hotels in the city having 1,452 rooms. On average, this creates some 589 jobs. The hotels had an average occupancy rate of 51.7% in 2006. Netanya's long seashore and many beaches have created a holiday industry, which in turn features resort hotels, restaurants, and malls.

Geography
Netanya is located on the Israeli Mediterranean Coastal Plain, the historic land bridge between Europe, Africa, and Asia. The city is the capital of the Sharon plain, a geographic region stretching from the Mediterranean in the west to the Samarian hills in the east, and the modern day Tel Aviv metropolitan area in the south northwards to Mount Carmel. Although capital of a densely populated region, Netanya itself is relatively separate from settlements to the north, south, and east, though over time, growth has incorporated some into what makes up modern day Netanya.

Apart from some small moshavim and kibbutzim, south of Netanya is relatively clear of settlement until Herzliya and the start of the Gush Dan, Tel Aviv Metropolitan Area. Likewise, to the north is clear of large settlement until Hadera, and the east until Tulkarm in the West Bank. The area to the east of Netanya does, however, have a large concentration of kibbutzim and moshavim in the Hefer Valley Regional Council and local councils of Kfar Yona and Even Yehuda.

Netanya itself is divided into a large number of neighborhoods (see Neighborhoods of Netanya), recently growing southwards out of the city to create a number of high-end coastal neighborhoods with industrial areas inland. Netanya is home to the Poleg nature reserve and the Irises Dora Rainpool nature park containing the world's largest population of iris atropurpurea. At the center of the park is a rainpool which fills up with water in the winter months, and dries up over the summer months. Signs along the rainpool include information on the types of flora and fauna which populate the ecosystem.

Neighborhoods

Kiryat Sanz 
In 1956 a beachfront in northern Netanya was selected as a home base for the Sanzer Hasidim by its leader, Rabbi Yekusiel Yehudah Halberstam. Halberstam established kindergartens, boys' and girls' schools, yeshivas, seminaries, synagogues, a children's home for orphaned and needy girls, an old-age home, and a hospital. In addition to religious services, Kiryat Sanz had a diamond polishing factory built by a New York diamond merchant. Halberstam established his court here in 1960. Following his death in 1994, his eldest son, Rabbi Zvi Elimelech Halberstam, known as the Sanzer Rebbe, became the spiritual leader of the Sanz community in Israel. In 2010,  Kiryat Sanz had a population of approximately 1000 families. Most of the older generation are Holocaust survivors. Besides its educational facilities for boys and girls from elementary to post-graduate, there are five synagogues, a mikveh, a printing house, a religious hotel, a religious nursing school, and the Laniado Hospital, which encompasses two medical centers, a children's hospital, a geriatric center and a nursing school, serving a regional population of over 450,000.

Neot Herzl 
Located in the center of Netanya, near the Netanya interchange. It is a unification of four neighborhoods: Shikkun Sela, Gan Beracha, Amidar and Ramat Herzl. The neighborhood, like the main street of the city that runs nearby, was named after Benjamin Ze'ev Herzl. The old settlement of Umm Khalid is also  located in this neighborhood.

Tobruk 
Lies west of the Ramat Hen neighborhood. The neighborhood was established during the Second World War and is named after the port city of Tobruk in Libya. It used to be a center of  Diamond cutting. In 1947, two British Army Sergeants were hanged in the inactive "Feldman" diamond polishing plant in this neighborhood.

Nof Hatayelet 
A comparably new neighborhood (year 2000) south of the "Carmel" hotel, along the cliff promenade. A paragliding site is located near the neighborhood.

Ein Hatkhelet 
A neighborhood of about 2,500 residents located in the north of Netanya, on the shores of the Mediterranean Sea near Avihayil. Ein Hatkhelet was established as a working class neighborhood in Emek Hefer in 1936. In 1948 it became part of the city of Netanya.

Ramat Ephraim 
Named after . Part of it is the Moshav "Ramat Tiomkin" which was established in 1932 and over time was incorporated into Netanya. The moshav was founded by the people of Betar, and a Kvutza named  . It was named after .

Ramat Chen 
One of the southern neighborhoods of the city, near Gesher HaAchdut. Previously called Pagi neighborhood, since it was founded by Poalei Agudat Yisrael  (Pagi is the Hebrew acronym of it).

Neot Ganim 
Previously called "Shikkun Vatikim", this neighborhood is one of the first neighborhoods in the city and it was established in the location of the city's immigrant  camp used to be. At its southern end is the cemetery of the city of Netanya.

Neve Itamar 
The neighborhood was established in 1944 as an independent settlement and was annexed to Netanya in 1949. It is named after Itamar Ben-Avi, who has been an important figure in the story of the establishment of Netanya.

Transportation

Public transportation

The public transportation in Netanya is based on buses, railway and service taxis.

The Netanya railway station is located near the city center, on the east side of Highway 2. Netanya Sapir railway station is located in the Poleg Industrial Area. Beit Yehoshua railway station, located in the moshav of Beit Yehoshua, immediately south of Netanya, is convenient for getting to southern Netanya and to the Poleg Industrial Area. These stations are connected to the city by Egged bus service, although Shay Li service taxis are highly predominant at the Beit Yehoshua station. There are direct trains from Netanya and Beit Yehoshua to Tel Aviv, Binyamina, Hadera, Herzliya, Lod, Rehovot, Ashdod, Ashkelon and other towns. All Israel Railways stations, including Ben Gurion Airport, can be accessed from Netanya by means of transfer stations such as Binyamina and Tel Aviv.

Egged buses run from the Netanya central bus station to Jerusalem, Haifa, Eilat and other destinations. Many neighborhoods have a direct connection to Tel Aviv without the need to pass through the central bus station. In addition, many Egged lines connecting Tel Aviv with the north of the country stop at the Netanya Interchange on Highway 2, giving Netanya a direct connection with Nazareth, Tiberias, Kiryat Shmona and many other northern destinations. Metropoline operates bus services to Tel Aviv, Bnei Brak and to the surrounding communities, including the city of Hadera. Some regional lines are still operated by Egged. The intracity transportation is based on Egged Ta'avura bus lines and Shay Li service taxis.

Culture

The Well House is a museum documenting the early history of Netanya. It is located in a historic building dating from 1928. Other museums are the Tribes of Israel Pearl museum of Yemenite Jewish Heritage, the Shlomo Dror Art Institute, and the Diamimon diamond museum. The Cliff Gallery, Gosher Gallery, Abecassis Gallery and Fourth Gallery are all located in the city.

War memorials include the Holocaust Train Car, Beit Yad Lebanim, a memorial to fallen IDF soldiers from Netanya, the National Memorial for Fallen Ordnance Corps, the Alexandroni Brigade Memorial, the National Victory Monument, dedicated to the Soviet Red Army victory over Nazi Germany,  and the Memorial to Victims of Acts of Terror.

In June 2016, a street in Netanya was named for Japanese diplomat Chiune Sugihara, who was responsible for saving Lithuanian Jews from Nazi persecution early in World War II through providing visas allowing travel eastwards, beyond the reach of the Third Reich's genocidal grasp.

Education
According to the Netanya Municipality, the city has 36,544 students including 5,351 pupils in 186 kindergartens, 16,748 in 46 elementary schools, and 14,445 in 16 high schools. Education in the city is controlled by the municipality's Education Administration. 52.7% of 12th grade students were entitled to a matriculation certificate (Bagrut) in 2001.

Netanya Academic College offers Bachelor's and master's degrees, and a unique program for high-school students.  Other institutions of higher education in the city are Ort Hermelin College of Engineering,  Zinman College of Physical Education and Sport Sciences, Lesley College, and Tesler School for Nursing. The Wingate Institute, Israel's National Centre for Physical Education and Sport, is located just south of the city.

Sports

The main stadiums in Netanya are the 13,610-seat Netanya Stadium. Netanya has three football teams, the main being Maccabi Netanya, whose main local rival is Beitar Nes Tubruk. The third is Maccabi HaSharon Netanya, though the team has been limited to fourth tier football in the Liga Bet. Elitzur Netanya represents the city in the first tier of Israeli basketball. In handball, the city is represented by Hapoel Netanya in the 2nd tier of the Israeli handball. In baseball, the city was represented by the Netanya Tigers of the Israel Baseball League. As part of the "Netanya – city of sport" program the beach soccer stadium was established and it currently hosts Israeli championship and international "Diamond tournament" games.

Aside from the professional sport teams, Maccabi Netanya also has a boxing and fencing club while Hapoel Netanya has judo and gymnastic clubs, and Elitzur Netanya has a lacrosse club.

The founder of Krav Maga, Imi Lichtenfeld opened a sports academy in Netanya for the continuation of his way and his martial art.

Netanya is also the home of paragliding in Israel. The moderate cliffs plus a stiff offshore breeze provide an ideal environment for safe and fun comfortable paragliding. Gliders are often seen cruising high above the beach, just along the cliff line.

Netanya was scheduled to host the 2015 European Short Course Swimming Championships in December. The venue of the event was to be the brand new swimming complex of the Wingate Institute. The new complex at the Wingate Institute features an Olympic-size pool with 10 lanes and 3m depth, backed by the latest built-in filtration systems, an 8-lane 50m pool and a 6-lane 25m pool.

Netanya hosted the World Lacrosse Championship tournament on July 12–21, 2018, thus making Israel the first country to host such where English is not the primary spoken language. Forty-six nations from around the world sent teams.

The city hosted the 2021 FINA Junior Water Polo World Championships.

Urban development

Several of the tallest buildings in Israel are located in Netanya. The construction of eight new skyscrapers, six of them over 30 stories, was approved in 2011. Dozens of 40–42-story skyscrapers have been planned, many of them along the shore.

Netanya is developing according to master plans for 2035 which seek to massively increase residential units and office space in the city, as well as a new marina and piers. As part of the plan, the intention of the municipality is for the city's population to reach 320,000 by 2035.

The city seeks to become a major tourist hub for local and overseas tourism, with an "Israeli Riviera" on the shore. Among the projects planned in 2013 was the construction of 2,062 housing units and 1,100 hotel rooms while leaving much of the land as open space. The city has set itself a goal to expand open space from 56 to 70 percent. The plan is expected to attract more residents, boost hotel development, and increase the number of gardens and green spaces. It has been suggested that as the city's population expands, a light rail system may be built there in the future.

Twin towns – sister cities

Netanya is twinned with:

 Batumi, Georgia
 Bournemouth, United Kingdom
 Como, Italy
 Dortmund, Germany
 Gelendzhik, Russia
 Giessen, Germany
 Gold Coast, Australia
 Nice, France
 Nowy Sącz, Poland
 Poděbrady, Czech Republic
 Sarcelles, France
 Siófok, Hungary
 Stavanger, Norway
 Sunny Isles Beach, United States
 Xiamen, China

Notable people

Linor Abargil (born 1980), Miss World 1998
Eduard Akuvaev (1945–2015), Russian-Israeli artist
Tova Ascher, Israeli film editor, director, and screenwriter 
Yityish Titi Aynaw (born 1991), Miss Israel 2013
Orit Bar-On (born 1975), Olympic judoka
Yehuda Barkan (1945–2020), actor and filmmaker
Edith Hahn Beer (1914–2009), Austrian Jewish woman who survived the Holocaust by hiding her Jewish identity and marrying a Nazi officer
Cheryl Bentov (born 1960), American real estate agent and former Israeli Mossad agent
Maya Bouskilla (born 1977), Moroccan-Israeli singer
Noah Brosch (born 1948), astronomer, astrophysicist and space researcher
Yonatan "Yoni" Chetboun (born 1979), member of the Knesset
Jacko Eisenberg (born 1980), singer
Eva Fabian (born 1993), American-Israeli world champion swimmer
Eli Finish (born 1975), actor and comedian
Yarden Gerbi (born 1989), world champion and Olympic bronze medalist judoka
Haim Gidon, martial artist
Moshe Glam (born 1968), football player
Ageze Guadie (born 1989), Olympic marathon runner
Nadav Guedj (born 1998), Israeli 2015 Eurovision Song Contest entrant
Yekusiel Yehudah Halberstam (1905–1994), Klausenburger Rebbe
Zvi Elimelech Halberstam (born 1952), Sanzer Rebbe
Yitzhak "Haki" Harel (born 1957), civil servant and army general
Mariano Idelman (born 1974), actor and comedian
Silvi Jan (born 1973), female professional and Israeli team footballer
Deniz Khazaniuk (born 1994), tennis player
Baruch Kimmerling (1939–2007), scholar and professor of sociology
Moti Kirschenbaum (1939–2015), television presenter and filmmaker
Elad Koren (born 1968), former professional footballer
 (1948-2018), Israeli film editor and lecturer in cinema
Aliza Lavie (born 1964), academic and politician
David Levin (born 1999), ice hockey player
Ronny Levy (born 1966), football player and now a manager
Imi Lichtenfeld (1910–1998), martial artist, founded Krav Maga
Nili Lotan, Israeli-American fashion designer
Oded Machnes (born 1956), football player
Tesama Moogas (born 1988), Olympic marathon runner
Sagi Muki (born 1992), reigning European judo champion
Andrea Murez (born 1992), Israeli–American Olympic swimmer for Israel
Amos Neheysi (born 1979), former football player 
Or Sasson (born 1990), Olympic bronze medalist judoka
Stav Shaffir, activist, journalist, and politician
Arik Shivek, basketball coach
Mordechai Spiegler (born 1944), football player
Shiraz Tal (born 1974), model
Shalom Tikva (born 1965), football player
Margalit Tzan'ani (born 1948), singer
Meir Wieseltier (born 1941), poet
Ehud Yatom (born 1948), Shin Bet agent and Knesset member
Ron Yosef (born 1974), openly gay Orthodox Jewish rabbi

Gallery

See also
List of Netanya neighborhoods
Wagon Monument (Netanya)

References

External links

Official website 
Official website 
Things to do in Netanya 
Places To Visit in Netanya 
Official tourism website
Other information, in French
Tourism site 
Surfing in Netanya
Tandem Paragliding Netanya
Historic scanned maps of Netanya, 1937-1966, from the Eran Laor Cartographic Collection, The National Library of Israel

 
Populated places established in 1929
French-Jewish culture in Israel
Sharon plain
Cities in Central District (Israel)
1929 establishments in Mandatory Palestine